Sućuraj (known as San Giorgio in Italian) is a smallest town on the island of Hvar in the Croatian part of the Adriatic Sea, 3 NM (5 km) from the Dalmatian coast and 77 km from the town of Hvar. Sućuraj has about 400 residents, with tourism and fishing being the primary economic activities. The town is the official centre of the eastern part of the island of Hvar.

The island of Hvar is famous for its pleasant Mediterranean climate, including a high percentage of sunny days. Sućuraj is one of the sunniest and hottest places on the island, with more than 2700 hours of sunshine per year. Around the centre of the town, there are two beaches, Cesminica and Bilina.

Sućuraj can be reached by ferryboat from Drvenik on the Makarska riviera, a trip of about 25 minutes. In the winter, there are 3-4 departures a day, and in summer there are 10-15 per day. The ferry dock is near the centre of the town. Drvenik is situated on the Adriatic road 96 km southeast of Split and 128 km northwest of Dubrovnik.

History
Sućuraj has existed for more than 2300 years, although it has been destroyed and rebuilt several times. The first known inhabitants of Sućuraj were the Illyrians; their Queen Teuta had a home here in 3rd century BC.

In the 7th and 8th century the Croats who lived here till today colonized Sućuraj. Sućuraj has fallen under a myriad of flags in its history, including the Illyrians, Romans, Croats, Venetians, French, Austrians, and Italians. In the 20th century alone, Sućuraj was part of six countries.

The oldest building in Sućuraj is the Augustan (today Franciscan) monastery. Its original construction date is not known, but it was first rebuilt in 1309 and most recently in 1994. Sućuraj got its name from the Church of St. George, which is mentioned in the Statute of Hvar from 1331. That church was destroyed at the end of the 19th century, and a new one was built. Most of the inhabitants of Sućuraj came from the coast in the 15th century, fleeing from the Turks. From that time till today the church of St. Anthony (built in 1663) has also survived. An old Venetian fortress (fortica) built in 1613 also still stands, although not in its original condition.

Sources
 

Hvar
Municipalities of Croatia
Populated places in Split-Dalmatia County
Populated coastal places in Croatia